"Disco 2000" is a song by British band Pulp, released on the band's 1995 album, Different Class. Featuring a disco-inspired musical performance, the song was based on Pulp singer Jarvis Cocker's childhood memories of his friend Deborah Bone, who he had "fancied" in his youth but could never impress.

"Disco 2000" was released as a single on 27 November 1995, the third from Different Class. The single reached number seven in the UK and charted in several others. The single release was accompanied by a music video directed by Pedro Romhanyi, which was based on the story told on the single's sleeve artwork. The song has since become one of Pulp's most famous tracks and has seen critical acclaim.

Background and lyrics
"Disco 2000" tells the story of a narrator falling for a childhood friend called Deborah, who is more popular than he is and wondering what it would be like to meet again when they are older. Pulp frontman Jarvis Cocker based the lyrics on a girl he knew as a child and recalled, "the only bit that isn't true is the woodchip wallpaper." He elaborated:

Deborah was based on a real-life childhood friend of Cocker's, Deborah Bone, who moved away from Sheffield to Letchworth when she was 10. As the lyrics suggest, she did marry and have children. Bone later reflected, "My claim to fame is growing up and sleeping with Jarvis Cocker, well someone had to do it, and it was all perfectly innocent! I have been told and like to believe that I am the Deborah in the Number 1 hit 'Disco 2000,' but we never did get to meet up by the fountain down the road."

The fountain referred to as the meeting place was Goodwin Fountain, formerly located on Fargate, in Sheffield city centre.

Music
"Disco 2000" took inspiration from disco music. Martin Aston of Attitude described the song as "seventies à go-go: the stamp of Elton John's 'Saturday Night's Alright For Fighting', Marc Bolan's glittery guitar, ABBA's sweeping gait and a huge swipe from Laura Brannigan's Hi-NRG epic 'Gloria'."

Drummer Nick Banks said of this influence, "We are very much influenced by disco, yeah. And of course in the late '80s we got into raves a bit, and music did take on more of a disco thump in places. Yeah, I'm always going down the disco, I love it."

Release
"Disco 2000" was released as the third single from Different Class on 27 November 1995. The single reached number seven on the UK Singles Chart, becoming the third top 10 single from Different Class, following "Common People" and the double A-side "Mis-Shapes"/"Sorted for E's & Wizz", both of which reached number two. The song also charted highly in Austria, Finland, Hungary, Iceland and Ireland, and it became Pulp's only top-fifty hit in Australia.

Due to its millennial subject matter, Pulp removed the song's synchronisation licence, effectively banning the song from being used in TV and radio trailers throughout 1999 and 2000.

Music video
The music video for "Disco 2000", directed by Pedro Romhanyi, adapted the story portrayed on the single's cover sleeve designed by Donald Milne. The video features a boy and a girl, played by models Patrick Skinny and Jo Skinny, respectively, meeting at a Saturday night disco and hooking up afterwards. The video, which features the song's 7-inch mix, featured the members of Pulp represented on cardboard cutouts and on televisions throughout (for this reason, drummer Nick Banks called the song "the easiest video [they] ever did"). Romhanyi explains:

Reception
"Disco 2000" has seen critical acclaim and has been labeled by many as one of Pulp's greatest songs. Stephen Thomas Erlewine of AllMusic praised its "glitzy, gaudy stomp." James Masterton for Dotmusic said it "is easily the best track from the Different Class album, the closest they have ever come to an out-and-out pop stormer and certainly a floor-filler at office parties this holiday with its chorus of 'Let's all meet up in the year 2000/Won't it be strange when we're all fully grown. A reviewer from Music Week rated it three out of five, adding, "A bouncing disco beat, based on the riff from Laura Branigan's 'Gloria,' sees a pumped-up Pulp and Jarvis doing his usual talking bit. But it may disappoint fans of their recent epics." Adrien Begrand of PopMatters called it a "fabulous single". David Fricke of Rolling Stone wrote, "As a singer and writer, Cocker specializes in hapless pining and geeky self-obsession, desperately holding on to a childhood crush in 'Disco 2000. Barry Walters of Spin wrote, "This band has quoted disco riffs before, but the way it alludes here to Laura Branigan's 'Gloria' approaches genius."   

NME readers ranked the song as Pulp's third best in a fan vote, while Orange County Weekly named the song as the number one Pulp song for beginners. Stereogum'''s Ryan Leas ranked it as the band's second best, calling it "one of the ultimate Pulp songs" and concluding, "It's about youth and romanticism, but filtered through the perspective of a man already in his early 30s. That's what makes it a classic pop single by Pulp."

In a 1996 interview, Elvis Costello praised the lyricism in the song, stating, "He's [Jarvis] very smart and I like his songs. I love the detail, like the thing in 'Disco 2000': 'There was woodchip on the wall.' I get the feeling that was a real memory."

Track listings
CD

 UK cassette editions have the same track listing.

12-inch

7-inch

Personnel
 Jarvis Cocker: Vocals
 Russell Senior: Guitar
 Mark Webber: Guitar
 Candida Doyle: Keyboards
 Steve Mackey: Bass guitar
 Nick Banks: Drums

Charts and certifications

Weekly charts

Year-end charts

Certifications

Cover versions
The song was covered by Nick Cave as a B-side for Pulp's single "Bad Cover Version" (2002), and again as a "pub rock" version on the deluxe edition of Different Class (2006).
Keane covered the song in 2008.

In popular culture
"Disco 2000" was featured in Episode 7 of the first series of Life on Mars, where DI Sam Tyler hears it come on the radio in 1973, and mentions to DCI Gene Hunt that he had seen Pulp play the Manchester Nynex in 1996, to Hunt's bemusement. The song also appeared in a party scene in the 2013 Seth Rogen film This Is the End, and again in "The End of the Tour" in 2015.

In 1996, it featured on the UEFA Euro 1996 official album, The Beautiful Game''.

The budget airline EasyJet used the song in a 2015 UK commercial celebrating their twenty years of revenue service.

References

External links
 Disco 2000 at Discogs

1995 singles
Pulp (band) songs
Song recordings produced by Chris Thomas (record producer)
Songs written by Jarvis Cocker
Songs written by Candida Doyle
Songs written by Russell Senior
Songs written by Nick Banks
Songs written by Steve Mackey
Songs written by Mark Webber (guitarist)
1995 songs
Island Records singles
Music videos directed by Pedro Romhanyi